Akkavak can refer to:

 Akkavak, Kahta
 Akkavak, Karaçoban